In the middle of 1984 a Brazilian company called Prológica, which made its own versions of 8-bit US computers, brought to the Brazilian market a new equipment for its personal computer series called "CP" (for "Computador Pessoal" in Portuguese, "Personal Computer" in English).

The CP 400 was launched in 1984 with a case very different from the original TRS-80 Color Computer and other clones. It was available in two models: I and II. The main differences between the two models were the power supply (built in), keyboard and RAM capacity.

This computer was 100% compatible with the original Color Computer 2 and was designed to work with the PAL-M TV standard.

See also 

 Codimex CD-6809
 TRS-80 Color Computer

References 

CP-400
Computer-related introductions in 1984
Goods manufactured in Brazil
Personal computers
Products introduced in 1984
TRS-80 Color Computer